Philip Roberts (born 1994), is an Irish footballer. Philip or Phillip Roberts may also refer to:

Phil Roberts (born 1950), Bristol Rovers and Portsmouth player of the 1970s
Philip Roberts (British Army officer) (1906–1997), senior officer of the British Army
Phillip Waipuldanya Roberts (1922–1988), Australian traditional doctor, activist and government adviser

See also
Robert Phillips (disambiguation)